Vadym Volodymyrovych Prystaiko (born 20 February 1970) is a Ukrainian diplomat currently serving as Ukraine's ambassador to the United Kingdom. He was appointed by President Volodymyr Zelenskyy on 20 July 2020.

Prystaiko is a former Minister of Foreign Affairs of Ukraine and former Deputy Foreign Minister of Ukraine. Between 2014 and 2019, he was also the Ukrainian ambassador to Canada between 2012 and 2014 and the head of the Mission of Ukraine to NATO from 7 July 2017 to 29 August 2019. In May 2019, Prystaiko served as the Deputy Head of the Presidential Administration for foreign policy issues. He is a member of the National Security and Defense Council of Ukraine since 31 May 2019. He is also former Vice Prime Minister for European and Euro-Atlantic Integration of Ukraine, serving from 4 March 2020 to 4 June 2020.

Biography 
Prystaiko was born on 20 February 1970 in the city of Kiliya (Odesa Oblast), Ukrainian SSR, Soviet Union. He went to school in Odesa, Kyiv, and Zaporizhia. Eventually, the family settled in Kyiv.

In 1994, Prystaiko graduated cum laude from the Kyiv Polytechnic Institute's Faculty of Computer Science. In 1998, he received a master's degree from the Ukrainian State University of Finance and International Trade. In addition to his native Ukrainian, he is fluent in Russian and English.

Prystaiko began his career in the private business sector. He was a co-founder of one of the first Ukrainian Internet providers and electronic media Electronni Visti.

In 1994, following his family's tradition of government service, he obtained a position at the Ministry of Foreign Economic Relations of Ukraine. At that time, the Ministry was expanding rapidly as Ukraine began to negotiate with GATT/WTO.

In 1997, he took a position in the economic section of the Ministry of Foreign Affairs of Ukraine, where he tried to develop trade with Asian countries. It was the most important task because, at that time, the Ministry initiated negotiations on Ukraine's accession to the GATT/WTO and started to look for new opportunities for Ukrainian business in the markets, especially in Africa and Asia. In 1997, he moved to the Asia-Pacific Department of the Ministry of Foreign Affairs.

In 2000, Prystaiko became a consul to Sydney, Australia where he was involved in political and economic issues.

Since 2002, he worked in the Foreign Policy Directorate of the Administration of the President of Ukraine Leonid Kuchma.

In December 2004, Vadym Prystaiko was appointed as a political counselor to the Embassy of Ukraine in Canada. Two years later, he became the acting chargé d'affaires (temporary counsel for Ukraine in Canada).

In 2007, he was a part of Ukraine's NATO negotiating team and served as the Deputy Director-General for NATO in the Ministry of Foreign Affairs.

In 2009, he became Deputy Chief of the Mission at the Embassy of Ukraine in Washington D.C.

On 8 November 2012, the President of Ukraine Viktor Yanukovich appointed Prystaiko as Ambassador of Ukraine to Canada. He became also a Ukrainian representative in the International Civil Aviation Organisation.

In December 2014, he was named Deputy Foreign Minister and head of the apparatus under Foreign Minister Pavlo Klimkin.

He was Head of the Mission of Ukraine to NATO (7 July 2017 – 29 August 2019).

On 22 May 2019, Prystaiko was appointed Deputy Head of the Presidential Administration by the decree of the President of Ukraine. He was a Member of the National Investment Council (21 June 2019).

On 29 August 2019, he became Minister of Foreign Affairs of Ukraine in the Government of Oleksiy Honcharuk. But on 4 March 2020, he was released from the post and appointed Vice Prime Minister for Euro-Atlantic Integration in the Government of Denys Shmyhal. On 4 June 2020, he was released from this post.

From 20 July 2020, he is Ambassador of Ukraine to the UK.

Since 30 December 2020, Prystaiko is a Representative of Ukraine in the International Maritime Organization (IMO).

In February 2022, during the 2021–2022 Russo-Ukrainian crisis, Prystaiko said UK defence secretary's Ben Wallace's comparison of diplomatic efforts with Russia to the appeasement policies of the 1930s was unhelpful. Prystaiko warned, "There's panic everywhere, not just in people's minds, but in financial markets as well" and it was "hurting the Ukrainian economy on sort of the same level as people leaving the embassy".

Family 
Vadym Prystayko's father  (1941–2008) was Lieutenant General of Justice and Vice director of SBU, but since 1991 he worked in a commission of adaptation of laws to EU standards and on rehabilitation of politically repressed. He is an Honored Lawyer of Ukraine.

He is married to Inna Prystaiko. They have two sons Volodymyr and Andrii.

He likes sports, earning a black belt in Taekwondo.

See also
Honcharuk Government
Shmyhal Government
List of foreign ministers in 2019
List of foreign ministers in 2020
Embassy of Ukraine, Ottawa
Embassy of Ukraine, London

References

External links 

 Пристайко Вадим Володимирович – Vadym Volodomyrovych Prystaiko
 Vadym Prystaiko, Deputy Minister for Foreign Affairs of Ukraine and head of the apparatus
 list of Ukrainian ambassadors in Canada
 Vadym Prystaiko Ambassador of Ukraine to Canada
 Event of Empire Club on April 4, 2014, personal career of Vadym Prystaiko

Ambassadors of Ukraine to Canada
Heads of mission of Ukraine to NATO
Kyiv Polytechnic Institute alumni
1970 births
Living people
Foreign ministers of Ukraine
European integration ministers of Ukraine
People from Kiliya
20th-century diplomats
21st-century diplomats
National Security and Defense Council of Ukraine
Servant of the People (political party) politicians
Vice Prime Ministers of Ukraine
Ambassadors of Ukraine to the United Kingdom